The 1987 Copa Perú season, the promotion tournament of Peruvian football.

In this tournament after many qualification rounds, each one of the 24 departments in which Peru is politically divided, qualify a team. Those teams enter the Regional round (8 groups) by geographical proximity. Some winners went to the Division Intermedia and some others with some runners-up went to the National round and then to the Final round.  In this edition, for the first time, the Final was not played in Lima, but in Trujillo, and only 4 teams participated. Matches were played in 1988.

The champion was promoted to 1988 Torneo Descentralizado.

Finalists teams
The following list shows the teams that qualified for the Final Stage.

Final stage

Final group stage

Round 1

Round 2

Round 3

Title Playoff

External links
  Copa Peru 1987
  Semanario Pasión

Copa Perú seasons
Cop